Ramin Khosravi, aka Mohammad Ebrahim Khosravi, is an Iranian football player who has played for Pas Tehran, Pas Hamedan and Esteghlal Khuzestan of the Iran Pro League.

Career
Khosravi had been with Pas Hamedan from 2010 until 2011.

References

External sources
 Profile at Persianleague

Living people
Iranian footballers
PAS Hamedan F.C. players
Esteghlal Khuzestan players
Malavan players
1984 births
Association football defenders
People from Karaj